St Edward's Secondary School is a public Catholic secondary school in Freetown, Sierra Leone. Since its inception it has remained one of the country's most prestigious schools. While St. Edwards is designed to be an all-male school, female students are permitted to enroll as A Level candidates. It is affiliated with St. Edward's Primary School.

St. Edwards has a long list of distinguished former pupils, including many of Sierra Leone's top ranking statesmen, presidents and prime ministers. The majority of the school's pupils have gone on the attend institutions of higher learning including Fourah Bay College, Oxford University, University of Cambridge and Harvard University.

History 
St. Edward's origins began with St. Edward's Primary School which was established in 1865 by a French Roman Catholic priest, Rev. Father Edward Blanchet. In 1921, the board of directors which consisted of a group of priests from Italy, France and Ireland decided to start a secondary school for the students. On February 6, 1922, the new secondary school opened its doors to seven St. Edward's Primary School graduates: Anthony Tucker, Sylvester Tucker, James Massallay, Edward Farrah, William Luke, Joseph Luke and Albert M. Margai - future prime minister of Sierra Leone. At that time, the secondary school was located at the same address as the primary school at Howe Street in Freetown. St. Edward's is the third oldest secondary school in Sierra Leone.

The first head master of St. Edward's was Father Michael O'Connor, but six months after the school opened, Father O'Connor retired due to illness and was replaced by Father Mulcahy.  Under the stewardship of Father Mulcahy, St. Edward's Secondary School became a first rate academic institution which followed a strict, old-fashioned British curriculum and enforced discipline by means of corporal punishment. The sports programs at St. Edward's became a source of general admiration.

Present 
Today, the school continues to be managed by a board of directors and the disciplinary committee remains intact. St. Edward's has maintained its longstanding traditions, which include a Scripture Union, a Literary Society and a Debating Society. The school also has a boy scout troop known as 8th Freetown.

St. Edward's is still widely held to be one of the best schools in the country. On May 1, 2000, headmaster J.P. Kamara and the school's Parent/Teacher Association started a Development Committee to facilitate the expansion of the school.

Past headmasters 
Past headmasters include:

Rev. Father Michael O'Connor (1922)
Rev. Father Mulcahy (1922-1956) - the school's indefatigable and definitive founding father who devoted most of his life to St.Edward's. 
Rev. Father Jeremiah O’Sullivan (1956-1979) - who introduced the co-ed sixth Form and founded the school band.
Mr. A.J. Robinson (1979) - known affectionately as 'Sir Rob'.
Rev. Father Curran
Rev. Father Hamelberg - St. Edward's alumnus and Sierra Leone's first indigenous priest and headmaster. 
Mr. M.A.C. Renner.
Mr. J.P. Kamara  (2000) - Commonly known as 'The great Tizo'.

House system 
The house system at St. Edward's was instituted in 1934 by the school's second headmaster, Father Mulcahy, in order to encourage competitive sportsmanship among the pupils. Following the Eton model, St. Edward's employs a system which divides the pupils into five houses. Each house has a House Captain and Games Captain. House Captains are usually selected from the sixth form students. Games Captains are chosen from the school's most talented athletes from Forms 4-6. Initially there were five houses, each with its own color and each named after the most reverend fathers who founded the school. They are: O'Gorman (Red), Browne (Green), Wilson (Dark Blue), Blanchet (Light Blue), and Mulcahy (Yellow). Later a sixth house was founded and named O'Sullivan. Its color is white.

There is inter-house competition during each semester culminating in an annual inter-school track-and-field championship. Houses also compete in extracurricular activities such as academic contests, debate and drama.

School prefects 
Members of the student body are elected as school prefects. St. Edward's Disciplinary Committee delegates the execution of various punishments to the school's council of prefects. Prefects are also responsible for the leadership of their fellow students in sport and academics. The House Captains and Games Captains are a part of the council.

Athletics 
St. Edward's is nicknamed "The Sports Academy". Throughout the school's history, athletics have been a prominent attribute of St. Edward's. The school is surrounded by sprawling fields where students can play sports and train in their respective disciplines. The land was acquired by former head master, Father Mulcahy, for the sole purpose of executing an ambitious athletics plan for the pupils. This remains a hallmark of St. Edward's even today. The school has produced a number of gifted sportsmen who play at national and international levels. Among them is football star Mohamed Kallon who began his career with the school team, Old Edwardians FC and went on to play for Inter Milan. Kallon also captained the national team, the Leone Stars.

Performing arts 
St. Edward's has excellent music and drama programs. The school band was founded by Father Jeremiah O'Sullivan during the middle half of the last century. The school also has an acclaimed dramatic society called St. Edward's Theater.

The school band is the most remarkable in the country’s history of school brass band music. They have won the Balanta Academy of Music Awards three times under the directorship of James Pratt, making them the only premier brass band in the country. They are regarded as the most successful school brass band after creating the first ever school jazz band section supported by the Balanta Academy of Music. The band is sometimes fondly referred to by other school band members as the Renner Brass band for the illustrious support the four sons of the late principal M.A.C Renner; namely Augustine M. Renner (alto saxophone) the current bandmaster, Jerry M. Renner (baritone) the music director, Christie J. Renner (trombone), Raymond D. Renner (trumpet) a former director and ex-member of the Republic of Sierra Leone Armed Forces Regiment Band and the last Edward A. Renner (horn); the four are all-rounder’s in music as they can play just every instrument in the brass and woodwind section of the band.

Under the supervision of Rev. Fr. John Garrick, the band consists of 60 players with multi talents in choral and brass music. A few of them include Emmanuel Beal, a second lieutenant in the Republic of Sierra Leone Armed Forces, Oluwole Compagnie-Coker, Abubakarr Barrie, Derrick Lewis, Joseph Senesi, Daniel Mettle, Abu Amadu, Christopher L.D Pratt (jr), Musa Sam Gandah, Henry Gagba, John Adowale Washington Williams, Victor Gordon, Silvanus Parkinson, Daniel Brown, Allieu Badarr, Joseph Macaulay, Michael Scott, Foday Mansaray, Timothy Bala Kamara, Mohamed Koroma and many others. The Band also has distance members in Europe and America such as Michael Kuwaite, Michael Kanyako, Theophilus Morrison, Augustine Thorpe, Dauda Sannoh, Foday Kanyako, Lyndon Pratt, Fredrick Hudor, Abdulai Turay, Elizabeth Kanja, Michael Faux, Dian Davies and lots more.

Celebrations 
St. Edward's celebrates February 6 as Foundation Day and October 13 as the Feast of St. Edward in honor of the school's patron saint, Edward the Confessor.

School uniform 
Students of St. Edward's are easily distinguished by their uniform which consists of a white shirt, dark shorts and a matching tie. In a country where there is no free compulsory education, attending secondary school is a rare privilege and the school uniform is a badge of honor.

School song
St. Edward Patron of our school 
And protector of our youth 
Guide us in our search for truth 
To the Holy Ghost Faithful 
Instill in us true leadership 
Model of Christian piety 
So may we always honor thee 
For all our lives to see

The name Edwardian proudly stands 
In our country's honor roll 
Inspiring us to follow close 
Those who to great heights rose 
With prayers our battle we shall fight 
And all life's struggles win 
We shall be loyal to our school 
To our kith and kin

However far in days to come 
Our lives may make us roam 
The closest friends will be those made 
In youth at boyhoods home 
Sing hail to Edward king and saint 
Confessor pure and chaste 
Enjoying now that heavenly bliss 
Which we soon hope to taste.

Old Edwardians 
St. Edward's alumni are called Old Edwardians. While the school is open to all students regardless of their economic, social or religious background, it is a favorite of the Sierra Leonean oligarchy as it has produced an impressive number of statesmen and community leaders.  Some of the most famous Old Edwardians include former Prime Minister of Sierra Leone, Sir Albert Margai and President Ahmad Tejan Kabbah. The senior generation of Old Edwardians are sometimes criticized for being a British-style old boy network. However, the alumni hold that they are most concerned with supporting their alma mater and contributing to the community. Among the younger generation of Old Edwardians, re-construction of the school is a key issue. The Georgia Chapter of St. Edward's Alumni Association runs a charity that raises funds to refurbish the school which was badly damaged during Sierra Leone's decade-long civil war.

Notable alumni 

Felix Alinyoh - former headmaster at St. Edward's Secondary School
George Banda-Thomas - former Minister of Political and Parliamentary Affairs in Sierra Leone
Dr. Cecil Blake
Dr. Alfred Bobson-Sesay - former Director General of Education, former Minister of Lands
Dr. Abass Bundu - former Executive Secretary of the Economic Community of West African States
Dr. S.B. Dumbuya - Leader of the House of Parliament
B.S. Elliott - former headmaster at St. Edward's Secondary School
Archbishop Joseph Ganda - Archbishop Emeritus of Freetown and Bo
Thomas Ganda - civil servant
Professor Septimus Kaikai - former minister of communication
Justice Nasiru-din Halladeen
Rev. Father Hamelberg - Sierra Leone's first indigenous priest and a St. Edward's headmaster
Cyril Patrick Foray - Sierra Leone's former Minister of External Affairs
Henry M. Joko-Smart - former Commissioner of Sierra Leone's Anti-Corruption Commission and former Chairman the Supreme Court
Ahmad Tejan Kabbah - former President of Sierra Leone
Mohamed Kallon - professional football player
Jon Moadeh Kamanda—former Minister of Health, Appeal Court Judge of the Special Court for Sierra Leone
Sir Albert Margai - second Prime Minister of Sierra Leone
Justice Arthur John Massally - former judge of the courts of Sierra Leone 
Dr. James Callay Massally - member of the first class and medical doctor
Professor Newman-Smart
Tinga Seisay - former Consul General to the United States and pro-democracy advocate
Dr. Kadi Sesay - feminist, pro-democracy advocate and Minister of Trade and Industry in Sierra Leone
Dr. P.L. Tucker - former headmaster at St. Edward's Secondary School, chairman law reform commission
A.J. Robinson former Principal St. Edward’s Secondary School 
M.A.C Renner former Principal St. Edward’s Secondary School
J.P. Kamara - Former Principal St. Edward’s Secondary School, Former Secretary General Sierra Leone Adult Education Association (SLADEA), and current Secretary General St. Edward’s Secondary School Old Boys Association
Mrs. Anna Caeser - Former Auditor General, Audit Service Sierra Leone
 Dr. Peter Alpha Dumbuya, History professor, lawyer and 2013-2014 Fulbright Scholar from the USA to Sierra Leone.
 Willie Matthew Ayodele De Graft-Rosenior - Father of professional footballer Leroy Rosenior and Grandfather of Liam Rosenior

External links 
http: www.edwardians.org - Edwards Alumni - U.S National Chapter
St. Edward's Alumni Association, Georgia, US Chapter

Catholic schools in Sierra Leone
Educational institutions established in 1922
Schools in Freetown

Catholic secondary schools in Sierra Leone
Boys' schools in Sierra Leone
1922 establishments in Sierra Leone